Giazotto is an Italian surname. Notable people with the surname include:

Adalberto Giazotto (1940–2017), Italian physicist, son of Remo
Remo Giazotto (1910–1998), Italian musicologist, music critic, and composer

Italian-language surnames